Richard Brooke or Broke (died 1569) bought the manor of Norton, near Runcorn, Cheshire from Henry VIII in 1545 following the dissolution of the monasteries.  The manor included the former monastery of Norton Priory and also the settlements of Norton, Stockham, Acton Grange and Aston Grange in Cheshire and Cuerdley in Lancashire.

Richard Brooke was the younger son of Thomas Brooke of Leighton in Nantwich Hundred.  In his earlier life he had been a soldier and he was admitted as a Knight of Malta in 1531. He then became Commander of Mount St. John in Cleveland. After the suppression of the Order by Henry VIII circa 1542, he was relieved of his religious vows and held the office of Vice-Admiral of England. In May 1544 he served in Lord Hertford's army in Scotland which sacked and burnt Edinburgh. Brooke captured and destroyed the fortress on the island of Inchgarvie in the Galley Subtile on 6 May 1544.

In September 1547 an English navy commanded by Lord Clinton comprising 34 warships with 26 support vessels sailed to Scotland. The Galley Subtle, captained by Richard Brooke, bombarded the Scottish army at the battle of Pinkie. William Patten included the ship in one of his plans of the battlefield, depicted in the woodcut with its oars visible, close to Musselburgh. The guns of the Galley and other ships in English fleet were recorded in an inventory. The Galley carried two brass demi-cannons, two brass Flanders demi-culverins, breech-loading iron double basses and single basses. It was also called the Rose or Red Galley.

After Pinkie, on 15 September Broke and the Galley Subtle rowed up the River Forth to Blackness Castle. After an exchange of fire he captured the Mary Willoughby, the Anthony of Newcastle and the Bosse, and burnt other ships.

Following the dissolution of the monasteries, the abbey of Norton Priory was made inhospitable. Having bought the property, it seems that Brooke did not have the resources necessary to build an expensive house and therefore he modified the west range of the abbey as his residence, while the cloister became a rubbish dump. The remaining buildings and the church were demolished and sold for building stone.

Following the accession of Queen Mary to the throne in 1553, Brooke assisted Reginald Pole in the re-establishment of the Order of St John in England. Brooke was Sheriff of Cheshire in 1563.  He was succeeded at Norton Priory by his eldest son, Thomas.

Family
He married Christian, daughter of John Carew of Haccombe in Devon, with whom he had three sons.

Richard Brooke's daughter Christiane married Richard Grosvenor of Eaton and was the mother of Sir Richard Grosvenor, 1st Baronet, the ancestor of the Dukes of Westminster.

References

1569 deaths
People from Runcorn
Knights of Malta
English admirals
16th-century Royal Navy personnel
Year of birth unknown